Jaheim Bell (born June 14, 2001) is an American football tight end for the Florida State Seminoles.

Early years
Bell attended Valdosta High School in Valdosta, Georgia. He played both tight end and wide receiver in high school. He tore his ACL midway through his senior season which caused him the miss the rest of the year. Bell originally committed to the University of Florida to play college football but changed to the University of South Carolina.

College career
Bell played in five games as a freshman at South Carolina in 2020, recording one reception for 29 yards. As a sophomore in 2021, he played in 13 games with five starts and had 30 receptions for 497 yards and five touchdowns.

His 2022 season was notable for his lack of carries and touches despite off-season hype coming off the previous year's Dukes Mayo Bowl. His uncle and mother both tweeted and caused a stir regarding the perceived lack of production and usage by the offensive coaching staff. Bell entered the transfer portal on December 5, 2022, signing with the Florida State Seminoles the following Monday.

References

External links
South Carolina Gamecocks bio

2001 births
Living people
People from Valdosta, Georgia
Players of American football from Georgia (U.S. state)
American football tight ends
South Carolina Gamecocks football players
Florida State Seminoles football players